In George Orwell's 1949 dystopian novel Nineteen Eighty-Four, the Thought Police (Thinkpol in Newspeak) are the secret police of the superstate of Oceania, who discover and punish thoughtcrime, personal and political thoughts unapproved by Ingsoc's regime. The Thinkpol use criminal psychology and omnipresent surveillance via informers, telescreens, cameras, and microphones, to monitor the citizens of Oceania and arrest all those who have committed thoughtcrime in challenge to the status quo authority of the Party and the regime of Big Brother. Orwell's concept of "policing thought" derived from the intellectual self-honesty shown by a person's "power of facing unpleasant facts"; thus, criticising the dominant ideology of British society often placed Orwell in conflict with ideologues, people advocating "smelly little orthodoxies".

In Nineteen Eighty-Four
In the year 1984, the government of Oceania, dominated by the Inner Party, uses the Newspeak language - a heavily simplied version of English - to control the speech, actions, and thought of the population, by defining "unapproved thoughts" as thoughtcrime; for such actions, the Thinkpol arrest Winston Smith, the protagonist of the story, and Julia, his lover, as enemies of the state. In conversation with Winston, O'Brien, a member of the Inner Party and a covert Thinkpol officer, reveals that the Thinkpol conduct false flag operations, such as by pretending to be members of the Brotherhood in order to lure out and arrest "thought criminals". 

As an agent provocateur, O'Brien gives Winston a copy of the forbidden book, The Theory and Practice of Oligarchical Collectivism, by Emmanuel Goldstein the enemy of the state of Oceania; yet the factual reality of The Brotherhood in Oceania remains uncertain, because O'Brien refuses to tell Winston whether or not the Brotherhood exists. The book explains that “Nothing is efficient in Oceania except the Thought Police,” as the Thinkpol is the only apparatus that must function effectively for the Party to retain control. There is a telescreen in the quarters of every Inner-party and Outer-party citizen, by which the Thinkpol audio-visually police their behaviour for unorthodox opinions, and to spy visible indications of the mental stresses manifested by a person struggling with ownlife, such as words spoken whilst asleep. The Thinkpol also spy upon and eliminate intelligent people, such as the lexicographer Syme, who is rendered an unperson despite his fierce loyalty to the Party and to Big Brother. It is later revealed Syme died in the same cell Winston is kept in.

To eliminate possible martyrs, men and women of whom popular memory might provoke anti–Party resistance, thought-criminals are taken to the Miniluv (Ministry of Love), where the Thinkpol break them with conversation, degradation (moral and physical), and torture in Room 101. In breaking prisoners, the Thinkpol coerce their sincere acceptance of the Ingsoc worldview and to love Big Brother without reservation. Afterward, the Thinkpol release the politically rehabilitated prisoners to the social mainstream of Oceania. If the released thought-criminals are found to have committed more thoughtcrimes, the Thinkpol re-arrest them for further interrogation and torture, and eventual execution that concludes with cremation into an unperson.

Moreover, every member of the Inner Party and of the Outer Party who ever knew, was acquainted with, or knew of any unperson must forget them, lest they commit the thoughtcrime of remembering an unperson. Such crimestop, ideological self-discipline, of not thinking independently, indicates the cultural success of the Newspeak language as a means of social control. Moreover, the Minitrue (Ministry of Truth) destroy all records of unpersons. The Thinkpol usually do not interfere with the lives of the Proles, the working classes of Oceania, but do deploy agents provocateur to operate amongst them, by planting rumours to entrap and identify and eliminate any Prole who shows intelligence and the capacity for independent thought, which might lead to rebellion against the cultural hegemony of the Party.

In other usages

In the early twentieth century, before the publication of Nineteen Eighty-Four, the Empire of Japan (1868–1947), in 1911, established the Tokubetsu Kōtō Keisatsu ('Special Higher Police'), a political police force also known as Shisō Keisatsu, the Thought Police, who investigated and controlled native political groups whose ideologies were considered a threat to the public order of the countries colonised by Japan. In contemporary usage, the term Thought Police often refers to the actual or perceived enforcement of ideological orthodoxy in the political life of a society.

See also
 List of fictional secret police and intelligence organizations
 Secret police
Thoughtcrime

References

Fictional elements introduced in 1949
Fictional intelligence agencies
Fictional law enforcement agencies
Nineteen Eighty-Four characters